The 2013 Sydney Roosters season was the 106th in the club's history. They competed in the 2013 National Rugby League season. The Sydney Roosters opened their 2013 season against their long-time rivals the South Sydney Rabbitohs. In 2013, Trent Robinson coached the Sydney Roosters. Anthony Minichiello captained the team in 2013 along with four vice-captains in Boyd Cordner, Jake Friend, Mitchell Pearce and Jared Waerea-Hargreaves. The Sydney Roosters completed their 2013 regular season as Minor Premiers, defeating the South Sydney Rabbitohs 24 – 12. The Sydney Roosters were crowned Premiers by defeating the Manly-Warringah Sea Eagles 26 – 18 in the 2013 NRL Grand Final.

2013 squad

Squad movements

2013 results

Pre-season

Regular season

Finals

Ladder

Player statistics

Representative honours

References

External links

 National Rugby League
 Rugby League Project
 Sydney Roosters
 Zero Tackle

Sydney Roosters seasons
Sydney Roosters season